A Resistive plate chamber (RPC) is a particle detector widely used in high energy physics. They are used for detecting muons in most of the modern experiments including ATLAS, CMS, and BES III.

References

Particle detectors
Science experiments